Monte Lera is  a mountain in  the Alpi di Lanzo, a sub-group of the Graian Alps, with an elevation of 1,368 m. It is located between the Val Casternone and the Ceronda valley in the communes of Val della Torre, Varisella and Givoletto.

It houses a sanctuary dedicated to the Madonna of the Snow, included in a regional reserve instituted in 1984 to protect the rare Euphorbia gibelliana.

SOIUSA classification 
According to the SOIUSA (International Standardized Mountain Subdivision of the Alps) the mountain can be classified in the following way:
 main part = Western Alps
 major sector = North Western Alps
 section = Graian Alps
 subsection = Southern  Graian Alps
 supergroup = catena Rocciamelone-Charbonel
 group = gruppo del Rocciamelone
 subgroup = cresta Lunella-Arpone
 code = I/B-7.I-A.2.b

References 

Mountains of the Graian Alps
Mountains of Piedmont
One-thousanders of Italy